This page details the records, statistics and career achievements of American basketball player Carmelo Anthony. Anthony is an American basketball forward and is currently playing for the Los Angeles Lakers of the National Basketball Association.

NBA career statistics
Statistics are correct as at March 11, 2020.

Regular season

Playoffs

Career-highs

Awards and accomplishments

NBA
NBA Scoring Leader: 2013
NBA Minutes leader: 2014
7x All-NBA selection:
 Second All-NBA team: 2010, 2013, 2010s Decade
Third All-NBA team: 2006, 2007, 2009, 2012
10x NBA All-Star: 2007, 2008, 2010, 2011, 2012, 2013, 2014, 2015, 2016, 2017
NBA Rookie Challenge MVP: 2005
NBA All-Rookie selection:
First Rookie team: 2004
3x NBA Western Conference Player of the Month
3x NBA Eastern Conference Player of the Month
11x NBA Western Conference Player of the Week
8x NBA Eastern Conference Player of the Week
6x NBA Western Conference Player of the Month
9th Leading Scorer In NBA History

United States National Team
4x Olympic medalist:
Gold: 2008, 2012, 2016
Bronze: 2004
FIBA World Championship medalist:
Bronze: 2006
FIBA Americas Championship medalist:
Gold: 2007
FIBA Americas Under-18 Championship medalist:
Bronze: 2002
USA Basketball Male Athlete of the Year: 2006, 2016
Individual single-game records
Points (Olympics): 37
3-point field goals made: 10
Free throws made: 13
Career total records:
 Games played (Olympics): 31
 Second all-time in points (Olympics): 336
 Field goals attempted (Olympics): 272
Second all-time in 3-point field goals attempted (Olympics): 139
Second all-time in 3-point field goals made (Olympics): 57
Rebounds (Olympics): 125

College
NCAA champion: 2003
Final Four Most Outstanding Player: 2003
Consensus second team All-American: 2003
NCAA East Regional Most Valuable Player: 2003
Consensus Big East Conference Rookie of the Year: 2003
USBWA National Freshman of the Year: 2003
All-Big East First Team: 2003
All-Big East Rookie Team: 2003
10x Big East Rookie of the Week
#15 retired at Syracuse University

High school
USA Today All-USA First Team: 2002
Parade First Team All-American: 2002
McDonald's High School All-American: 2002
Sprite Slam Jam dunk contest champion: 2002
Les Schwab Invitational Most Valuable Player: 2002
Baltimore Catholic League Player of the Year: 2001
Baltimore Sun All-Metropolitan Player of the Year: 2001
Baltimore County Player of the Year: 2001

NBA records
Youngest player to log a double double in a playoff game: (19 years, 331 days)
First player in NBA history to start first 1000 games (accomplished December 9, 2017 at Memphis Grizzlies)

NBA achievements
One of three players in NBA history to have a 20-20 game as a small forward
 Includes Shawn Marion and Giannis Antetokounmpo.
One of two players in NBA history to lead their team in playoff points per game as a rookie
 Includes David Robinson
Only player in NBA history to score at least 50 points with no points in the paint.
Only player in NBA history to record at least 40 points and 0 turnovers in a game.
Only player in NBA history to score 62+ points in Madison Square Garden.
Only player in NBA history to record 62+ points with 10 free throw attempts or less in a game.
Only player in NBA history to record 42+ points, 17+ rebounds, and 6+ assists in a playoff game.
One of two players in NBA history to record 62+ points and 0 assists in a game.
 Includes Kobe Bryant.
 One of three players in NBA history to score over 10,000 points with two different franchises.
 Includes Kareem Abdul-Jabbar and Elvin Hayes
One of two players in NBA history to have a 40 point game as a teenager.
Includes LeBron James.
One of three players in NBA history to average at least 20 points as a teenager.
Includes LeBron James and Kevin Durant.
One of four players in NBA history to score at least 60 points at Madison Square Garden in a game.
Includes Bernard King, Kobe Bryant, and James Harden
One of three players in NBA history to score at least 40 points while having at least a 60% FG percentage in three consecutive games.
Includes Michael Jordan and Bernard King.
 One of six players in NBA history to have 24,000 points, 6000 rebounds, 2500 assists, 1000 steals and 1000 3 point field goals.
 Includes Kobe Bryant, Dirk Nowitzki, LeBron James, Paul Pierce and Vince Carter
 One of six players in NBA history to score 50+ points multiple times for two different teams.
Includes Wilt Chamberlain, Pete Maravich, Bernard King, Kevin Durant, and LeBron James
One of three players in NBA history to record 62+ points and 13+ rebounds.
Includes Michael Jordan and David Robinson.
One of nine rookies in NBA history to capture all six Rookie of the Month awards.
Includes David Robinson, Tim Duncan, LeBron James, Chris Paul, Kevin Durant, Blake Griffin, Damian Lillard and Karl-Anthony Towns.
Luka Dončić won all five awards presented during the 2018-2019 season.

Denver Nuggets franchise records and achievements

Regular season

Career
Career records cited from Basketball Reference's Denver Nuggets Career Leaders page unless noted otherwise.
6th all-time in games played: 564
Behind Alex English, T.R. Dunn, Byron Beck, Dan Issel and Bill Hanzlik.
3rd all-time in minutes played: 20521
Behind Alex English and Dan Issel.
3rd all-time in field goals made: 4989
Behind Alex English and Dan Issel.
3rd all-time in field goals attempted: 10877
Behind Alex English and Dan Issel.6th all-time in 3-point field goals made: 410Behind J. R. Smith, Michael Adams, Chauncey Billups, Dale Ellis and Nick Van Exel.
3rd all-time in 3-point field goals attempted: 1320Behind J. R. Smith and Michael Adams.
3rd all-time in free throws made: 3582Behind Alex English and Dan Issel.
2nd all-time in free throws attempted: 4462Behind Dan Issel.
9th all-time in rebounds: 3566Behind Dan Issel, Byron Beck, Dikembe Mutombo, Alex English, Julius Keye, Marcus Camby, Nene Hilario and Fat Lever.
7th all-time in steals: 634Behind Fat Lever, T.R. Dunn, Alex English, Dan Issel, Nene Hilario and Bobby Jones.
2nd all-time in turnovers: 1726Behind Dan Issel.
7th all-time in personal fouls: 1693Behind Dan Issel, Alex English, Byron Beck, Danny Schayes, Nene Hilario and Bill Hanzlik.
3rd all-time in points: 13970Behind Alex English and Dan Issel.
Games with 50+ points: 2Tied with Alex English and Kiki Vandeweghe.
Games with 40+ points: 19Games with 30+ points: 163SeasonPointsConsecutive games of 20 points or more: 20 (October 28-December 7, 2009)
Consecutive games of 30 points or more: 6 (twice during the 2006–07 season)
Tied with Alex English (1982–83)

Game
Free throws attempted: 24 (on December 18, 2005 vs. Atlanta Hawks))
Most points scored in a game by a rookie: 41 (on March 30, 2004 vs. Seattle SuperSonics)
Most points scored in one quarter: 33 (on December 10, 2008 vs. Minnesota Timberwolves)

Playoffs

Career

Service
Minutes played: 17377th all-time in games played: 45Behind Alex English, T.R. Dunn, Bill Hanzlik, Dan Issel, Mike Evans and Danny Schayes.

Scoring
2nd all-time in points scored: 1104Behind Alex English. (1982–1990)
3rd all-time in points per game: 24.5Behind Alex English and Kiki Vandeweghe.

Game
Points: 42 ( vs. Utah Jazz)
Tied with Alex English. (2 times)

New York Knicks franchise records and achievements

SeasonPoints:
Consecutive games of 20 points or more: 31 (November 16, 2012 – February 1, 2013)
Consecutive games of 40 points or more: 3 (April 2–5, 2013)
Tied with Bernard King (November 21–24, 1984)

GamePoints:
Points scored in a game: 62 (January 24, 2014)
Points scored in Madison Square Garden in a game: 62 (January 24, 2014)
Points scored in a quarter: 25 (January 19, 2017)Field goalsField goals made in a game: 23''' (January 24, 2014)

References

External links
Official Site
Player Profile at NBA.com
Player Profile at ESPN.com

Anthony, Carmelo